Anastasia Olegovna Pivovarova (born 16 June 1990) is a former professional tennis player from Russia. She reached a career-high ranking of 93, in May 2011.

During a successful junior career, she was ranked as high as No. 2.

Career
Pivovarova 2005 began her professional career on the ITF Women's Circuit. In only her second tournament, she won the first singles title. In Moscow, she won the final against Olga Panova, in straight sets. In 2007, she won three singles titles and one doubles title on the circuit. At the 2008 French Open, she tried to qualify for the first time for the main draw of a Grand Slam tournament, failing to do so. At the US Open, she qualified but then lost against Patty Schnyder, in three sets. In Seoul, she managed her first victory in the main draw of a WTA Tour tournament.

Pivovarova retired in 2012, due to an injury, started to work in the President Administration of Russian Federation right after and opened a tennis club called APcenter in Moscow before doctors allowed her to play again. In March 2014, she made a comeback on the ITF Circuit. Since August 2018, Pivovarova again has been inactive.

ITF Circuit finals

Singles: 16 (10 titles, 6 runner-ups)

Doubles: 19 (7 titles, 12 runner-ups)

References

External links
 
 

1990 births
Living people
People from Chita, Zabaykalsky Krai
Russian female tennis players
Sportspeople from Zabaykalsky Krai